Losada is a small genus of bembicine wasps found in South America. Species include:

Losada mutilloides (Ducke, 1903)
Losada paria Pate, 1840
Losada penai Fritz, 1873

References

Crabronidae
Apoidea genera